The 1985 Philippine Basketball Association (PBA) Reinforced Conference was the third and last conference of the 1985 PBA season. It started on September 8 and ended on November 28, 1985. The tournament is an Import-laden format, which requires an import or a pure-foreign player for each team.

Format

The following format was observed for the duration of the conference:
 Double-round robin eliminations; 12 games per team; Teams were then seeded by basis on win–loss records.
 Team with the worst record after the elimination round was eliminated. The top two teams advanced outright to the semifinals. 
 The next four teams qualified to the single round robin quarterfinals. Results from the eliminations were carried over. The top two teams advanced to the semifinals. 
 Semifinals were a double round robin affair with the four remaining teams. The top two teams in the semifinals advanced to the best-of-seven finals. The last two teams disputed the third-place trophy in a best-of-seven series.

Elimination round

Semifinal berth playoffs

First round 

With 4:52 left in the second period, Jaworski caught a wayward elbow from Jeff Moore during a rebound play. This opened a big cut on Big J's upper lip. He had to be rushed at the Medical City hospital for treatment. The cut lip allegedly required nine stitches.

Jaworski return to the game late in the third quarter. The Gins were only down by six, 68–74, at the end of the quarter.  Teaming up with Francis Arnaiz, the Big J put Ginebra ahead, 89–86, after completing a three-point play with 6:08 left. From there, it was nip and tuck, Jaworski nailed Ginebra's final basket for the final count.

Second round 

Ginebra took a commanding 12-point advantage, 63-51, in the early going of the third period. The lead was narrowed to a solitary point by the Thirst Quenchers at the end of the third quarter.

Quarterfinals

Semifinal berth playoff

Semifinals

Results

Second seed playoff

Third place playoffs

Finals

References

PBA Reinforced Conference
Reinforced Conference